Gavrani (also Romanized as Gāvrānī; also known as Gārūnī, Gārvānī, Gaurawani, and Gāv Ravānī) is a village in Mansuri Rural District, Homeyl District, Eslamabad-e Gharb County, Kermanshah Province, Iran. At the 2006 census, its population was 487, in 104 families.

References 

Populated places in Eslamabad-e Gharb County